Incantation is a Super Nintendo Entertainment System platforming game released in 1996 by Titus France. Targeted towards young children, Incantation was released in late 1996, near the end of the lifetime of the Super NES.

Gameplay

The player controls a young wizard who has to complete several levels. Enemies are defeated by using different ranged spells that can be found throughout the levels, with different firing patterns and power. Some levels require players to pick up a certain amount of items while other have a boss battle.

Reception
Captain Squideo for GamePro gave the game a 2.5 out of 5 for graphics, 1.5 for sound, and 2.0 for both control and funfactor.

Maniac gave it a 62 out of 100.

References

1996 video games
Fantasy video games set in the Middle Ages
Side-scrolling platform games
Super Nintendo Entertainment System-only games
Super Nintendo Entertainment System games
Titus Software games
Video games about magic
Video games developed in France
Single-player video games